Paradoxodacna piratica is a species of fish in the family Ambassidae, the Asiatic glassfishes. It was described in 1989 and placed in a new monotypic genus of its own, Paradoxodacna. It is native to Indonesia, where it occurs in Sumatra and southern and western Borneo.

This species grows to a length of  SL. It has specialized teeth and retrognathous jaws: the upper jaw is longer than the lower. It eats the scales of other fish. This habit inspired its species name, piratica.

This fish lives in tropical streams and rivers.

References

Ambassidae
Monotypic fish genera
Fish of Indonesia
Fish described in 1989